The 2021 Hamilton Tiger-Cats season was the 63rd season for the team in the Canadian Football League and their 71st overall. The Tiger-Cats qualified for the playoffs for the third consecutive year following their week 14 win over the BC Lions on November 5, 2021. The team defeated the Montreal Alouettes and Toronto Argonauts in the playoffs to qualify for their 22nd Grey Cup game appearance. In a rematch of the previous season's game against the Winnipeg Blue Bombers, the Tiger-Cats lost to the Blue Bombers 33–25 in overtime in the 108th Grey Cup game.

The 2021 season was the second season under co-general managers Drew Allemang and Shawn Burke and the second season under head coach Orlondo Steinauer.

An 18-game season schedule was originally released on November 20, 2020, but it was announced on April 21, 2021 that the start of the season would likely be delayed until August and feature a 14-game schedule. On June 15, 2021, the league released the revised 14-game schedule with regular season play beginning on August 5, 2021.

Offseason

CFL Global Draft 
The 2021 CFL Global Draft took place on April 15, 2021. With the format being a snake draft, the Tiger-Cats selected eighth in the odd-numbered rounds and second in the even-numbered rounds.

CFL National Draft 
The 2021 CFL Draft took place on May 4, 2021. The Tiger-Cats had the most selections in the six-round draft with seven picks after acquiring another first-round pick (ninth overall) from the Montreal Alouettes as part of the Johnny Manziel trade. The team had the first pick in odd rounds and the ninth pick in even rounds.

Preseason 
Due to the shortening of the season, the CFL confirmed that pre-season games would not be played in 2021.

Planned schedule

Regular season

Season standings

Season schedule 
The Tiger-Cats initially had a schedule that featured 18 regular season games beginning on June 10 and ending on October 29. However, due to the COVID-19 pandemic in Canada, the Canadian Football League delayed the start of the regular season to August 5, 2021 and the Tiger-Cats began their 14-game season on August 5, 2021.

Post-season

Schedule

Team

Roster

Coaching staff

References

Hamilton Tiger-Cats seasons
2021 in Ontario
2021 Canadian Football League season by team